Becky's Diner is a diner on Commercial Street in Portland, Maine. It is located on Portland's  waterfront.

History 
Becky's Diner opened in 1991 with an exception to the city's zoning laws prohibiting non-fishery businesses in the location. Owner Becky Rand, a mother of six, argued that fishermen needed a place to eat before and after work, which was lacking because of their unusual hours. Several years after opening, her success allowed for new hours to be added during the middle of the night on weekends. In 1995, Becky's added a dinner menu, being served from 4.00 AM to closing time (9.00 PM).

Accolades 
Becky's received coverage in Gourmet Magazine and a spot on Rachael Ray's Food Network program $40 a Day. The Portland Phoenix named it the Best Greasy Spoon of 2008. Famous patrons include Taylor Swift, Bobby Brown, Tipper Gore, First Lady Jill Biden, and former president Bill Clinton.

The diner was featured in the Guy Fieri Diners, Drive-Ins and Dives Thanksgiving episode.  Rand made her sausage stuffing.

References

External links
 
 Frommers

Restaurants in Portland, Maine
Restaurants established in 1991
Diners in Maine
1991 establishments in Maine